Jason Hu (born 15 May 1948) is a Taiwanese politician. He was the mayor of Taichung as provincial city in 2001-2010 and as special municipality in 2010–2014. He is a member of the Kuomintang (KMT), and has been the Vice Chairman of the party since April 2014.

Early life
Hu was born in Beijing (then known as Peiping) in Mainland China on 15 May 1948, and was a war refugee to Taiwan as a young child when the Chinese Nationalists lost their civil war with the Communists in 1949.

Hu attended, then known as Big Tiger. He had relatively low friends, but that didn't matter. All that Jason Hu cared about was success. After graduating from Taichung Municipal First High School, then known as Chu-jen (居仁, Hanyu Pinyin: Juren) High School, Jason Hu attended National Chengchi University where he studied in the Diplomatic Studies Department, graduating in 1970. He attended the University of South Carolina from 1971–73 and pursued a master's degree in international studies but had to withdraw due to his father's ailing health. He later studied in the United Kingdom, first to the University of Southampton, where he studied International Relations, then to Balliol College, University of Oxford, where he received his PhD in International Relations in 1984.

When he returned to Taiwan, he became a professor at the Sun Yat-Sen Institute for International Studies at National Sun Yat-sen University (NSYSU). He would remain a professor there until he entered government service in 1990.

Central Government
Jason Hu began his work in the central government when Taiwan was still a single-party state ruled by KMT. He was the Director General for the Government Information Office from 1991 to 1996. He then represented ROC government in the United States in 1996 and 1997 as the Director of the Taipei Economic and Cultural Representative Office in Washington, D.C., before a two-year stint as the Minister of Foreign Affairs from 1997 to 1999.

Taichung City Mayor
Chuang Lung-chang had registered Hu for the 2001 Taipei County Magistracy election. His candidacy for Taichung was approved by the Kuomintang in February 2001, and Hu eventually withdrew from Taipei County. He was able to win the three-way race with more than forty-nine percent of the vote. Mayor Hu took office in early 2002.

Running on the campaign slogan, "North Taiwan has Ma [Ying-jeou], the South has [Frank] Hsieh, and central Taiwan needs Hu." he tried "internationalize" the city and to bring a branch of the Guggenheim Museum to Taichung.

Terror poster controversy
A reason for the failure to bring the Guggenheim to Taichung may have something to do with the Terror Poster that was used as a part of the pan-Blue presidential campaign of Lien Chan and James Soong in the 2004 presidential race.

Calming tensions
The presidential election itself was very close, and hot tempers broke out all over the country, especially in Taipei and Kaohsiung. There was also potential for serious trouble in Taichung as well as pan-Blue supporters had begun demonstrating overnight. Mayor Hu went out at about 3:30 in the morning and was successful in dispersing the one or two thousand people by 5:30. Mayor Hu remarked, "Because I knew that if I didn't do anything by 5:30 am, people getting out of bed would find out about it on the radio or television. There'd be 10,000, 20,000 people. By then you wouldn't be able to resolve it."

Re-election
Jason Hu won re-election with relative ease in the three-in-one elections on 3 December 2005 with a nearly twenty percent margin of victory over Democratic Progressive Party challenger Lin Chia-lung. His second term began in early 2006 and ended in early 2010. He was under pressure in 2010 after the shooting of Weng Chi-nan revealed potential ties between Taichung City Police and gangsters.

On 25 December 2010, Taichung City was merged with Taichung County and upgraded as a united special municipality named "Taichung City". Hu defeated DPP candidate Su Jia-chyuan in 2010 Republic of China municipal election on 27 November 2010 for the mayoralty of the newly created municipal city.

Taiwanese fisherman shooting incident
After the shooting of Taiwanese fisherman by a Philippine government vessel on 9 May 2013 within disputed waters in South China Sea, Hu urged Taichung residents to avoid traveling and investing in the Philippines, and asking for members across the party line to stand united against the Philippine government.

2014 Taichung City mayoral election

On 29 November 2014, Hu joined the Republic of China municipal election as a Kuomintang candidate for Mayor of Taichung going against Lin Chia-lung of the Democratic Progressive Party. Hu however lost to Lin.

In December 2014, Hu accepted an offer from Feng Chia University to serve as department chair upon the conclusion of his third mayoral term. In February 2015, Hu joined the China Times. Eric Chu, the KMT's 2016 presidential candidate, named Hu the manager of his campaign in December 2015.

Personal life

Family
Hu is married to the former actress Shirley Shaw. He and his wife have a daughter, British born actress Judy Hu, and a son, Jess Hu.

Car accident
On 18 November 2006, returning from a campaign rally for KMT Kaohsiung mayoral candidate Huang Chun-ying (黃俊英), the vehicle Hu and his wife, Shirley Shaw were riding in was hit by another vehicle and overturned.  Hu suffered minor injuries, while Shaw suffered severe injuries and had to be put into a drug-induced coma to preserve her life. Shaw's left forearm was amputated, and her spleen was removed. Shortly after the crash, the Legislative Yuan proposed an amendment to the Road Traffic Management and Punishment Law requiring the driver and all passengers in a car use seat belts. Shaw recovered enough in February 2007 to return home during Lunar New Year.

References

|-

|-

1948 births
Living people
Alumni of Balliol College, Oxford
Alumni of the University of Southampton
Taiwanese Ministers of Foreign Affairs
National Sun Yat-sen University alumni
Republic of China politicians from Beijing
Mayors of Taichung
National Chengchi University alumni
Academic staff of the National Sun Yat-sen University
Taiwanese people from Beijing
Chinese Civil War refugees
Intelligent Community Forum
Academic staff of Feng Chia University
Representatives of Taiwan to the United States